Discofox or disco fox is a social partner dance which evolved in Europe in the mid-1970s as a rediscovery of the dance hold in the improvisational disco dance scene dominated by solo dancing, approximately at the same time when the hustle emerged in the United States. Both dances were greatly influenced by Saturday Night Fever starring John Travolta. In various regions, it is also known under different names: disco hustle, swing fox, disco swing, and rock fox.

Discofox is very popular in Austria, Germany, Poland, Switzerland and becoming popular in Russia.
 
The set of figures is influenced by various dances: foxtrot, swing, salsa, etc., adapted to the musical style and basic step of the dance. Moreover, various fusion styles emerged, such as sals-discofox and disco cha.

Tempo may vary. In a social setting it is mostly danced in one place, although the couple may also move across the dance floor. It is danced with various types of single and double handhold. Among the figures are various handwraps, spins, throw-outs/catches, poses, drops, and for competitions also acrobatic figures.

There are international competitions in discofox.

Basic timing and step

The beginner's count of the basic step is "step-step-tap". Advanced dancers use the hustle-style split-beat four-step basic (still occupying 3 beats of music), counted variously: (1,2, & 3), (1,2, a3) (1,2, 3&), (1,2, 3a).

Social dance
Partner dance
Competitive dance